Tracy Dawson is a Canadian actress, comedian and writer. She is best known for her role as Meghan Fitzpatrick in Call Me Fitz, for which she won the Gemini Award for Best Lead Actress in a Comedy Series or Program at the 2011 Gemini Awards. She won the same award at the 2nd Canadian Screen Awards. She has lived in Los Angeles since 2006 and gained American citizenship in 2015.

Career 
An alumna of The Second City's Toronto company, her other credits include The Gavin Crawford Show, Wild Card, Duct Tape Forever, SketchCom and an appearance as a guest anchor on This Hour Has 22 Minutes in 2006. She also portrayed Deimata, Skylar's personal monster from the 2012 Disney Channel Original Movie, Girl vs. Monster.

Dawson wrote the stage play Them & Us, which premiered at Theatre Passe Muraille in 2009. She has also written for Call Me Fitz, SketchCom, Single White Spenny, and Your Family or Mine.

Filmography

Film

Television

References

External links

Canadian film actresses
Canadian television actresses
Canadian stage actresses
Canadian television personalities
Canadian women comedians
21st-century Canadian actresses
21st-century Canadian dramatists and playwrights
Canadian women dramatists and playwrights
Canadian television writers
Actresses from Ottawa
Writers from Ottawa
Living people
21st-century Canadian women writers
Canadian sketch comedians
Best Actress in a Comedy Series Canadian Screen Award winners
Canadian women television writers
Canadian women television personalities
21st-century Canadian screenwriters
21st-century Canadian comedians
Comedians from Ontario
1983 births